Jaghan (also Romanized as Jaghān; also known as Jaghīn and Jaqān) is a village in Kuh Shah Rural District, Ahmadi District, Hajjiabad County, Hormozgan Province, Iran. At the 2006 census, its population was 335, in 72 families.

References 

Populated places in Hajjiabad County